Ferrucci is an Italian surname. Notable people with the surname include:

Andrea Ferrucci (1465–1526), Italian sculptor
David Ferrucci
Nicodemo Ferrucci (1574–1650), Italian Baroque painter
Piero Ferrucci, Italian psychotherapist and philosopher
Santino Ferrucci (born 1998), American Formula 2 Racing Driver
Simone Ferrucci (1437–1493), Italian sculptor
Simone di Nanni Ferrucci (born 1402), Italian sculptor

See also
Ferruccio

Italian-language surnames